Little Hautbois is a small hamlet in Broadland, England, part of the parish of Lamas. The name is pronounced 'Hobbis',  and can be seen thus spelled on a memorial on the outside of nearby Lamas Church. The population of the hamlet is included in the civil parish of Buxton with Lamas.  In the Middle Ages, the settlement of Great Hautbois was the head of the navigation on the River Bure, and it is thought Little Hautbois developed from that. The name, which can be translated to "High Woods" in English, is taken from that of the de Alto Bosco, or de Haut Bois, family, who acquired these lands at the Norman Conquest (alternatively, they may have taken the name from the settlement, Blomefield being uncertain on this point. 

, Little Hautbois consisted of eight dwelling-houses, one a holiday cottage rented out by the owner. The church of Little Hautbois, once owned by the monks of St Benet's Abbey, fell into ruin in the 15th century when the parish was amalgamated with that of Lamas. Although ruins were still visible in the 18th century, no sign of the building now remains above ground; the only trace of its existence is a depression in the grounds of Hautbois Hall. Little Hautbois has the feel of an isolated rural community now, but two former main transport routes pass through it: the River Bure, canalised in the 18th century to allow navigation up to Aylsham, and the Bure Valley Railway, now a light steam railway but formerly a full-sized railway.

St. Mary's Church
Sources indicate that this was a building of some importance, dedicated to the Virgin Mary. Metal detector work on the site, which lay between the Hall and the road, has uncovered, among other things, a Papal seal. Some have identified this as the site of a chapel and hospital for travellers, founded by the de Alto Bosco family, who held the parishes of Great and Little Hautbois at the time of the Domesday Book, although this hospital may have stood a little further up the river, at Great Hautbois, and confusion arisen because of the dedication of both churches to the Virgin Mary. Foundations were visible in 1907.

The Adam and Eve
Little Hautbois had a public house, the Adam and Eve, until the middle of the 20th century. During the Second World War, it was a popular drinking place for personnel of the nearby RAF Coltishall airfield. Today, the Adam and Eve is a private house, but the house's past is preserved in its name of Adam and Eve House. The remains of a pub sign-board are visible beside the front gate of the house's large gravel forecourt. Adam and Eve House has a fine three-bay frontage, the upper floor being lit by three dormer windows. The brick is diapered in a simple chequerboard pattern. Adam and Eve House was built in the 18th century as a farmhouse, extended by the addition of a lower, two-storey wing in the 19th century. 20th-century alterations included the addition of a garage and the rearrangement of windows in the lower block. It was originally thatched, as was the barn (now converted into a house called Eden Cottage) beside it. The roof of the house was replaced with pantiles in the 20th century after a fire seriously damaged the barn.

Hautbois Hall

Hautbois Hall is a 10,842 sf private residence set in grounds by the River Bure. It was built in the reign of King Edward VI in 1553, and remains a splendid example of a Tudor manor house with pretensions. Probably erected on the site of an existing manor house, the house contains a medieval staircase. Three storeys in height and four bays in length, it is only one room deep. The two-storey kitchen block, while almost identical in style to the main black, is 17th century in date. Tall chimneys and finials on gables and dormer windows increase the building's height, while stone mullioned windows and diapered brickwork add to the building's impressive appearance. It is thought that the family of the original builder went bankrupt about a century after its building and the buildings passed into the ownership of a charity connected with the church of St Peter Parmentergate, Norwich. A painting dated 1840 shows large extensions, removed in a late-19th-century restoration.

The hall has been painstakingly restored, and it retains many of its original Tudor features.

Other notable buildings
Bridge Farmhouse, by the railway bridge, displays simple diapering on the wall that faces the road, but is otherwise unremarkable, having been much altered and now subdivided to form two dwellings. Foxwood, formerly the White House, has a Georgian front built onto a house with older origins. The present bridge over the River Bure is built over the remains of an older bridge that lifted up to allow wherries to pass underneath. The old bridge, built around the 15th century, is of two arches and built of brick. It incorporates two strange arched niche-like structures that have been variously interpreted as shelters for travellers caught in the rain and as lurking-places for excise-men. Percy Millican, in his history of Horstead and Stanninghall, links these with a similar arch not far from the bridge there, which is of similar date. Millican describes the bridge as standing high and dry, although today water flows under both of these arches. St Theobald's Church, now in ruins, is a round tower church from the 11th century. It was ruinated in around 1860. It is a listed building.

Sources
Francis Blomefield: An Essay Towards a Topographical History of Norfolk, William Miller, London, 1807.
Millican, Percy: A History of Horstead and Stanninghall, H.W. Hunt, Norwich, 1937
Pevsner, Nikolaus: The Buildings of England: Norfolk
Clearly visible memorial stone at St Andrew's, Lamas
NOAH: Norfolk On-Line Access to Heritage
List of vicars of Little Hautbois displayed at St Andrew's Church, Lamas
Norfolk Tourist Board Leaflet, walk 53
Norfolk Churches Site
Hoseason's Catalogue
Norfolk Heritage Explorer

References

Hamlets in Norfolk
Broadland